Cohune oil is pressed from the seeds of the cohune palm, which is native to Central and South America.

Along with other byproducts of the palm, cohune oil is believed to have been used by cultures in southern Mesoamerica since the pre-Columbian era, in particular by the Maya. Uses of the oil include as a lubricant, for cooking, soapmaking and lamp oil. For this latter purpose the oil was placed in earthenware or soapstone lamps and lit with a wick, for cooking and illumination.

Cohune oil is made up of the following portions of fatty acids:

Commercialization 
Cohune oil is generally not used commercially because the cohune palm is very difficult to break open. However, the manufacture and usage of the oil continues among certain contemporary Maya communities in Belize, Guatemala and Honduras.

References

External links
 Attalea cohune, Floridata

Vegetable oils
Maya society
Fatty acids